The Aiken Taylor Award for Modern American Poetry is an annual prize, administered by the Sewanee Review and the University of the South, awarded to a writer who has had a substantial and distinguished career. It was established through a bequest by Dr. K.P.A. Taylor, a poet and younger brother of Conrad Aiken.

Winners

 1987 — Howard Nemerov
 1988 — Richard Wilbur
 1989 — Anthony Hecht
 1990 — W. S. Merwin 
 1991 — John Frederick Nims
 1992 — Gwendolyn Brooks 
 1993 — George Starbuck 
 1994 — Wendell Berry 
 1995 — Maxine Kumin
 1997 — Fred Chappell
 1998 — X. J. Kennedy
 1999 — George Garrett
 2000 — Eleanor Ross Taylor
 2001 — Frederick Morgan
 2002 — Grace Schulman
 2003 — Daniel Hoffman 
 2004 — Henry Taylor 
 2005 — B.H. Fairchild
 2006 — Brendan Galvin
 2007 — Anne Stevenson 
 2008 — John Haines 
 2009 — Donald Hall
 2010 — Louise Glück 
 2011 — Billy Collins 
 2012 — Debora Greger 
 2013 — William Logan 
 2014 — Dana Gioia
 2015 — Marie Ponsot
 2016 — Christian Wiman
 2017 — Mary Ruefle
 2018 — Heather McHugh
 2019 — Carl Phillips
 2020 — Nikky Finney
 2021 — Vievee Francis

See also
American poetry
List of poetry awards
List of literary awards
List of years in poetry
List of years in literature

External links
 

American poetry awards